Three vessels of the Royal Navy have been named HMS Blandford after Blandford Forum:
  was a 20-gun Gibraltar group frigate launched in 1711. She foundered in the Bay of Biscay in 1719.
  was a 20-gun 1719 Establishment frigate launched in 1719 and sold in 1742.
  was a 24-gun modified 1733 Establishment frigate launched in 1741. In 1755 she was seized by the French off Brest in retaliation for the seizure of French ships in Canada but later released. She was sold in 1763.

References
 

Royal Navy ship names